28 de Julio (Veintiocho de Julio, also called simply Veintiocho) is a village and municipality in Gaiman Department, Chubut Province in southern Argentina, and is west of the lower Chubut River. To its east is Dolavon, to its north is National Route 25, to its south is a boundary, and to its west is Boca Toma.  The economy in the village is primarily agricultural.

References

External links
Info at Ministry of the Interior
Town information (archive link) 

Populated places in Chubut Province